Chavuma is a constituency of the National Assembly of Zambia. It covers 13 wards, including the town of Chavuma and the surrounding rural area in Chavuma District of North-Western Province.

List of MPs

References

Constituencies of the National Assembly of Zambia
1991 establishments in Zambia
Constituencies established in 1991